Kremenca is a small settlement in the Municipality of Cerknica in the Inner Carniola region of Slovenia.

References

External links

Kremenca on Geopedia

Populated places in the Municipality of Cerknica